The Museo Civico di Montepulciano, also known as the Museo Civico Pinacoteca Crociani,  is the town or comune art gallery and museum. It is housed in the medieval Palazzo Neri Orselli, a 14th-century structure located on Via Ricci #10, corner with Via Talosa, in the center of the town of Montepulciano, in the Province of Siena, region of Tuscany, Italy. The museum was founded in 1954.

History
The collection includes archeologic works and lapidary inscriptions from the region. The art gallery originated with a donation to the commune in 1859 of the collection of Francesco Crociani. It was complemented since then by works from various sources including closed ecclesiastical institutions.

Among the masterpieces in the collections is a 13th-century St Francis of Assisi by Margaritone d’Arezzo; a Madonna and Child with two Angels attributed to a 14th-century follower of Duccio da Buoninsegna called the “Master of Badia a Isola”; a Coronation of the Virgin by  Jacopo di Mino del Pellicciaio; a Nativity by Benvenuto di Giovanni; a Crucifixion by  Filippino Lippi; an Allegory of the Immaculate Conception with Saints by Giovanni Antonio Lappoli; a Holy Family with young St John the Baptist by il Sodoma; an Enthroned Madonna and Child derived from the church of Santa Lucia and painted by Luca Signorelli; a Sant’Agnese Segni with a Model of the City of Montepulciano attributed to Domenico Beccafumi; a Portrait of the Blessed Caterina De' Ricci attributed to Giovanni Battista Naldini; a Children playing with Cat attributed to Abraham Bloemart; and a Portrait of a Nobleman (presumed to be Scipione Caffarelli Borghese) and attributed to Caravaggio.

Other works in Pinacoteca

Annunciation to the Shepherds attributed to Livio Mehus
Triumph of Joseph attributed to Pietro Sorri
Holy Family and Young St John attributed to Polidoro da Lanciano
Madonna and Child, Angel with fruit basket attributed to Sebastiano Bastianino
Girl with cymbal attributed to Antonio Amorosi
Portraits attributed to Antonio Franchi, Carlo Maratta, Alessandro Allori, and  Tiberio Titi
Portrait of Violante di Baviera by Bartolomeo Mancini
Portrait of Maria Maddalena Baroni de' Siri by Benjamin von Block
Mystical Marriage of St Catherine with St Francis, John the Baptist, St Bernard by Bicci di Lorenzo
Portrait of Eleonora Garcia Toledo by studio of Francesco Brina
Parable of the Rich Man by studio of Francesco Bassano the Younger (the biblical Rich man and Lazarus)
Portrait of a Knight of Malta by studio of Franz Pourbus the Younger
Portrait of Gentleman by studio of Giusto Suttermans
Adoration by Shepherds by studio of Hans von Aachen
Moses as a child before Pharaoh by studio of Pier Dandini
Madonna and Child by studio of Raffaellino del Garbo
Portrait of Primicerio Francesco Crociani by Candido Sorbini and studio
Kitchen Interior by Carlo Antonio Crespi
Portici sul mare by follower of Agostino Tassi
Landscape with Vocation of Peter by follower of Filippo Napoletano
St Francis of Assisi by a follower of Francesco Traini
Madonna and Child (da Raffaello) by studio of Lorenzo Costa
Madonna of the Humility, John the Baptist, St Blaise and Holy King attributed to Cristoforo di BindoccioStill life with musical instruments (1712) by Cristoforo MunariAllegory by Gioacchino CrovattoTwo Landscapes with shepherdesses by Ernest DaretEx-voto for Miracle the Lightning bolt of August 28, 1671 at Salone del palazzo Comunale, anonymousGesù Bambino dormiente con la croce attributed to Marcantonio FranceschiniSt Catherine of Alexandria by Francesco CurradiSophonisba by Francesco BottiPortrait of Francesco Carletti by François Xavier FabrePortrait of Luigi Chiarini (abbot) by Tebaldo FumiPortrait of Count Giovanni Angelo Bastogi by G. ComandoliVenus and Amore by Antonio Domenico GabbianiHoly Family and Young St John the Baptist attributed to Giacinto GimignaniSanta Maria Maddalena penitente by Giovanni Antonio Galli lo SpadarinoBaptism by Giovanni BalducciFortress of Montepulciano by Italiano ZecchiSerenade with dancers and musicians by Jan MielLandscape with fiume e figure by Jan Frans van Bloemen (Orizzonte)Crucifixion by Luca di TomméLandscape with Roman Ruins by follower of Gaspar DughetPortrait of Nicola Cerbara by Torquato MazzoniStill-life of mushrooms and vegetables by Nicola van HoubrakenSt Clare by Nicolò BettiSt Jerome in Desert'' by Palma il Giovane

References

Museums in the Province of Siena
Art museums and galleries in Tuscany
Museo Civico
Art museums established in 1954